Cheneta Jones (born February 8, 1985) is an American urban contemporary gospel artist and musician. She started her music career, in 2012, with the release of the studio album, Transformed, by Habakkuk Music, and this charted on two Billboard charts Top Gospel Albums and the Heatseekers Albums chart.

Early life
Jones was born on February 8, 1985, as Cheneta Jones in St. Louis, Missouri. She started into music, when she was sixteen years old as a background vocalist for Tye Tribbett. Jones was at one time in an R&B group, yet she left to further her ministry in the church, becoming an urban contemporary gospel artist.

Music career
Her music recording career commenced in 2012, when she released, a studio album, with Habakkuk Music, Transformed, on May 22, 2012. This earned her a Stellar Award nomination, for Best New Artist. The album was her breakthrough release upon the Billboard magazine charts, where it placed at No. 13 on the Top Gospel Albums and at No. 17 on the Heatseekers Albums. Her song, "Get There", charted at No. 29 on the Gospel Songs chart. She now has a single out, "It's You (A Love Song)," featuring fellow gospel singer Zacardi Cortez.

Discography
Studio albums

References

External links
 Official Website
 Facebook page

1985 births
Living people
African-American songwriters
African-American Christians
Musicians from St. Louis
Songwriters from Missouri
21st-century African-American people
20th-century African-American people